Silver City is an unincorporated community in Pennington County, South Dakota, United States, outside Rapid City. It lies at the head of Pactola Lake on Rapid Creek, and is about 5 miles west of U.S. Route 385 via a paved county road. It is not tracked by the U.S. Census Bureau.

History
The area was first referenced by General George A. Custer who entered the Hills in 1874 and referred to the area as Elkhorn Prairie. The first settlement at Silver City was made in 1876. Silver City was a mining town for many years. It was located on the Black Hills and Western Railroad until its abandonment a few years before the construction of Pactola Dam.

Today, the town is a resort area with a campground and cabins for rental. There is also a church. Additional USFS campgrounds are located nearby, and there is a walk-in trout fishing area along Rapid Creek to the west of the town. Silver City has a volunteer fire department, and a small community center in the old schoolhouse, but is now part of the Hill City School District. The community of about 80 homes is becoming a bedroom community for Rapid City. The town is also the start of a Volksmarch that goes around Pactola Lake.

Notes

Black Hills
Unincorporated communities in Pennington County, South Dakota
Rapid City, South Dakota metropolitan area
Unincorporated communities in South Dakota